Skyrock is a French radio station based in Paris created in 1986, and is mainly dedicated to mainstream rap music and R&B.

History
In March 1986, Skyrock was created by Pierre Bellanger.

External links
   
   
  
   
 Podcasts of Skyrock radio shows

Radio stations in France
Radio in Paris
Radio stations established in 1986
1986 establishments in France